Montcalm County is a county in the U.S. state of Michigan. As of the 2020 Census, the population was 66,614. The county is geographically located in the West Michigan region of the Lower Peninsula. The county seat is Stanton, and the largest city is Greenville. The county is named for General Marquis Louis-Joseph de Montcalm, military commander of French troops during the French and Indian War. The county was set off in 1831 and organized in 1850.

Montcalm County is part of the Grand Rapids-Kentwood, MI Metropolitan Statistical Area.

Geography

Adjacent counties
Isabella County (northeast)
Mecosta County (north)
Gratiot County (east)
Newaygo County (west)
Ionia County (south)
Kent County (southwest)
Clinton County (southeast)

National protected area
 Manistee National Forest (part)

Major highways

Demographics

As of the census of 2000, there were 61,266 people, 22,079 households, and 16,183 families residing in the county.  The population density was 86 people per square mile (33/km2).  There were 25,900 housing units at an average density of 37 per square mile (14/km2).  The racial makeup of the county was 94.83% White, 2.17% Black or African American, 0.60% Native American, 0.26% Asian, 0.05% Pacific Islander, 0.64% from other races, and 1.46% from two or more races.  2.28% of the population were Hispanic or Latino of any race. 25.5% were of English ancestry, 22.5% were of German ancestry, 9.5% were of Irish ancestry, 6.0% were of Dutch ancestry and 5.7% were of Danish ancestry according to the 2010 American Community Survey estimate. 96.4% spoke only English at home, while 2.1% spoke Spanish.

There were 22,079 households, out of which 35.30% had children under the age of 18 living with them, 58.80% were married couples living together, 9.70% had a female householder with no husband present, and 26.70% were non-families. 21.90% of all households were made up of individuals, and 9.20% had someone living alone who was 65 years of age or older.  The average household size was 2.65 and the average family size was 3.07.

In the county, the population was spread out, with 27.10% under the age of 18, 8.30% from 18 to 24, 30.20% from 25 to 44, 22.30% from 45 to 64, and 12.10% who were 65 years of age or older.  The median age was 36 years. For every 100 females there were 105.50 males.  For every 100 females age 18 and over, there were 106.00 males.

The median income for a household in the county was $37,218, and the median income for a family was $42,823. Males had a median income of $32,635 versus $23,645 for females. The per capita income for the county was $16,183.  About 7.40% of families and 10.90% of the population were below the poverty line, including 14.00% of those under age 18 and 8.70% of those age 65 or over.

Government

The county government operates the jail, maintains rural roads, operates the
major local courts, keeps files of deeds and mortgages, maintains vital records, administers
public health regulations, and participates with the state in the provision of welfare and
other social services. The county board of commissioners controls the
budget but has only limited authority to make laws or ordinances.  In Michigan, most local
government functions — police and fire, building and zoning, tax assessment, street
maintenance, etc. — are the responsibility of individual cities and townships.

Elected officials
 Prosecuting Attorney: Andrea Krause
 Sheriff: Michael J. Williams
 County Clerk: Kristen Millard
 County Treasurer: JoAnne Vukin
 Register of Deeds: Lori A. Wilson
 Drain Commissioner: Todd Sattler
 County Commission:Chris Johnston; Jeremy Miller; Adam Petersen; Patrick Q. Carr; Ron Baker; Scott Painter; Phil Kohn; Michael Beach; Kathy Bresnahan
 Road Commissioners: Dale J. Linton; Bob Brundage; S. Michael Scott

(information as of August 2019)

Communities

Cities
Carson City
Greenville
Stanton (county seat)

Villages
Edmore
Howard City
Lakeview
McBride
Pierson
Sheridan

Census-designated places
Crystal
Trufant

Other unincorporated communities

 Amble
 Cedar Lake
 Conger
 Coral
 Entrican
 Fenwick
 Gowen
 Langston
 Sidney
 Six Lakes
 Vestaburg
 Westville
 Wyman

Townships

Belvidere Township
Bloomer Township
Bushnell Township
Cato Township
Crystal Township
Day Township
Douglass Township
Eureka Charter Township
Evergreen Township
Fairplain Township
Ferris Township
Home Township
Maple Valley Township
Montcalm Township
Pierson Township
Pine Township
Reynolds Township
Richland Township
Sidney Township
Winfield Township

Education

The county has nine libraries, including the Montcalm Community College Library, Carson City Public Library, Crystal Community Library, Flat River Community Library, Home Township Library, Reynolds Township Library, Richland Township Library, Tamarack District Library, and White Pine Library.

See also
Cowden Lake
 List of Michigan State Historic Sites in Montcalm County, Michigan
National Register of Historic Places listings in Montcalm County, Michigan

References

External links

Montcalm County government
Ionia Montcalm Magazine website

 
Michigan counties
1850 establishments in Michigan
Populated places established in 1850